Corethrovalva goniosema is a moth of the family Gracillariidae. It is known from South Africa.

The larvae feed on Allophylus natalensis. They mine the leaves of their host plant. The mine has the form of a rather small, irregular, oblong, transparent blotch-mine.

References

Endemic moths of South Africa
Acrocercopinae
Moths of Africa
Moths described in 1961